This is the discography of American hardcore punk band Beartooth. They currently have released four studio albums, three extended plays, twenty singles and nineteen music videos.

Studio albums

Extended plays

Singles

Music videos

Compilation appearances

References

Punk rock discographies